Stig Mårtensson (1 February 1923 – 1 August 2010) was a Swedish racing cyclist. He competed in the individual and team road race events at the 1952 Summer Olympics.

References

External links
 

1923 births
2010 deaths
Swedish male cyclists
Olympic cyclists of Sweden
Cyclists at the 1952 Summer Olympics
People from Västerås Municipality
Sportspeople from Västmanland County